Rosemary is a village in southern Alberta, Canada. It is home to one school and several businesses.

Demographics 

In the 2016 Census of Population conducted by Statistics Canada, the Village of Rosemary recorded a population of 396 living in 146 of its 150 total private dwellings, a  change from its 2011 population of 342.

The Village of Rosemary's 2012 municipal census counted a population of 421.

See also 
List of communities in Alberta
List of villages in Alberta

References

External links 

1951 establishments in Alberta
Villages in Alberta